Bob Greene is a New Hampshire Republican politician.

Early life and education
Greene was born in Chicago, Illinois and raised in Wisconsin and later earned his bachelor's degree from Lawrence University and his master's degree from the University of Northern Colorado.

Career
Greene served in the United States Air Force from 1987 to 2007 and was stationed at Chanute Air Force Base, Scott Air Force Base, Ramstein Air Base, and Hanscom Air Force Base.

After retiring from the Air Force, Greene worked for Raytheon Technologies and BAE Systems, where he retired in 2019.
    
On November 6, 2018, Greene was elected to the New Hampshire House of Representatives where he represents the Hillsborough 37 district (Hudson and Pelham). He assumed office later in 2018 and is currently serving his second term.

Committee assignments
Greene serves on the Legislative Administration Committee as the Vice Chair and on the Judiciary Committee.

Personal life
Greene is a 16-year resident of Hudson, New Hampshire. He is married to his wife Kathy of 32 years.

References

Living people
People from Hudson, New Hampshire
Republican Party members of the New Hampshire House of Representatives
21st-century American politicians
Year of birth missing (living people)